ZEE5 is an Indian subscription video on-demand and over-the-top streaming service, run by Zee Entertainment Enterprises. It was launched in India on 14 February 2018 with content in 12 languages. The ZEE5 mobile app is available on Web, Android, iOS, Smart TVs, among other devices. ZEE5 claimed 56 million monthly active users in December 2019.

History
Ozee was an Indian digital online platform that was launched in February 2016 by Zee Entertainment Enterprises. As of 14 February 2018, the service has been integrated into ZEE5.  It aired shows from all of the Zee channel bouquets such as Zee TV, & TV, Zee Café. It aired Zindagi shows exclusively since Zindagi went Ozee-exclusive. The platform was ad-supported and also free of cost no matter what device used. It was shutdown due to ZEE5.

ZEE5 integration 
ZEE5 has subsumed Zee's existing video streaming platforms: Ozee (advertising-based) and DittoTV (subscription-based), comes with 1 lakh (1 hundred thousand) hours of content including exclusive originals, Indian and international movies and TV shows, music, live television, health and lifestyle videos in 12 regional languages.

Programming 
The platform started streaming web series in 2018 with Nanna Koochi (Telugu), America Mappillai (Tamil) and Dhatt Tere Ki (Hindi). In the same year, the platform also introduced another web series titled, Kallachirippu which was produced by popular filmmaker Karthik Subbaraj, and Karenjit Kaur – The Untold Story of Sunny Leone, a biographical web series on Sunny Leone.

In 2018, ZEE5 was launched with original shows such as Nanna Koochi, America Mappillai, Life Sahi Hai and Karenjit Kaur – The Untold Story of Sunny Leone'.

In July 2019, ZEE5 and ALTBalaji announce content alliance – ZEE5 subscribers will get seamless access to ALTBalaji's originals in addition to existing ZEE5 content.

Exclusive dubbed programming 
OZEE aired these exclusive shows until getting integrated into Zee5.
 Total Dreamer (Zindagi) (2017–2018)
 A Love Story (Zindagi) (2017–2018)
 Snowdrop (Zindagi) (2017–2018)
 Boys Over Flowers (Zindagi) (2017–2018)

Live TV 
All the shows owned by Zee TV were telecast on ZEE5. Music videos were in a separate section of the site; and it offered a wide collection of movies. Channels on-air on ZEE5 before integration with Zee included those broadcast as: Zee TV, & TV (Hindi), Zee Keralam (Malayalam), Zee Marathi (Marathi), Zee Sarthak (Odia), Zee Kannada (Kannada), Zee Telugu (Telugu), Zee Bangla (Bengali), Zee Punjabi (Punjabi), Zee Tamil (Tamil), Zee Ganga (Bhojpuri) and Zee Café (English). Entertainment Channels not on ZEE5 included: Zee Anmol (old series taken from Zee TV), Zee Yuva (old series taken from Zee Marathi and Zee Yuva).

Original programming

Original series

HiPi
HiPi is a video sharing social platform for Indian audiences where users can record and upload their own videos and can also view and engage with the videos shared by other people. Users can access the platform on the ZEE5 App for free.

Availability 
The service has been launched in every country, lastly in the United States on June 22, 2021. ZEE5 has launched Ad Suite which has Ad Vault, Ampli5, Play5 and Wishbox. ZEE5 is also available for free on Vodafone Play (a streaming service of Vodafone Idea) and Airtel Xstream (a streaming service of Bharti Airtel). Vodafone Idea joined ZEE5 and formed a new channel known as ZEE5 Theater which airs original movies and shows of ZEE5 exclusively available on vodafone play and the Idea mobile and TV app.

Mobile app 
The platform also offers a mobile app on all platforms, and it has partnered with global tech giants like Applicaster, Lotame, Talamoos and A.I. video enhancement startup Minute.ly to provide enhanced UI/UX and improved application performance.

See also 
 SonyLIV
 Crunchyroll
 Wakanim
 Anime on Demand
 VRV
 Zee Entertainment Enterprises

References

External links

Zee5 Mod APK  
Indian entertainment websites
Subscription video on demand services
Zee Entertainment Enterprises
2005 establishments in Maharashtra
Indian companies established in 2005